The Swift 014.a is an open-wheel formula racing car, designed, developed and built by American company Swift Engineering, for the Formula Atlantic spec-series, between 2002 and 2005. It was powered by a naturally aspirated  Toyota 4A-GE, but also used a  Mazda MZR. This drove the rear wheels through a 5-speed Hewland sequential gearbox. It was eventually succeeded by the 016.a in 2006.

References

Swift Engineering vehicles
Formula Atlantic